Character comedy is a genre in which a comedian performs as a character they have created.

List of character comedians
Notable character comedians include:

[[Barry Humphries] - plays [Dame Edna Everage]
Tim Allen – Plays a handyman in Home Improvement and his stand-up routines
Rowan Atkinson – Plays Mr. Bean
Colleen Ballinger – Plays the talentless and cocky Miranda Sings
Maria Bamford – Plays a neurotic version of herself in her stand-up shows
George Carlin – Played Al Sleet the "hippy-dippy weatherman" in his stand-up routine
Jim Carrey – Often portrays a hyperactive maniac
Charlie Chaplin – Played The Tramp
Andrew Dice Clay – Has played the "Diceman" character for most of his stand-up career
Sacha Baron Cohen – Plays Ali G, Borat, and Brüno, among others; mostly avoided public appearances and out-of-character interviews until the mid-2010s
Stephen Colbert – Performed a fictional version of himself on The Daily Show and The Colbert Report
Steve Coogan – Plays various characters, most notably Alan Partridge
Leigh Francis – Plays original characters such as Keith Lemon and various parodies of celebrities
Ricky Gervais – Plays various characters
Ilana Glazer and Abbi Jacobson – Perform live stand-up as the characters from their comedy series Broad City
Andy Kaufman – Played various characters
Chris Lilley – Played Ja'mie King, Mr G, and Jonah Takalua on the miniseries Summer Heights High
Harold Lloyd - Played Lonesome Luke and Glasses Character
Sam Lloyd – Plays various characters
Anders Matthesen – Plays various characters, some of which starred in the 2004 film Terkel in Trouble
George Miller – Played and created various characters, most famously Filthy Frank and Pink Guy
Joe Pera – Plays a version of himself in Joe Pera Talks With You (TV series) and his stand-up routines
Paul Reubens – Plays Pee-wee Herman
Martin Short – Played Jiminy Glick, Irving Cohen, Ed Grimley, Nathan Thurm, and various others
Sarah Silverman – Played a dim-witted and naïve character who treads insensitively through controversial topics in her early stand-up shows
Catherine Tate – Plays various characters, mostly in The Catherine Tate Show
Jane Turner and Gina Riley – Play various characters such as Kath Day-Knight and Kim Craig from Kath & Kim, and rarely make out-of-character public appearances
Tracey Ullman – Plays various characters
Jim Varney – Plays Ernest P. Worrell and Aunty Nelda in various productions
Sam Hyde – Plays various characters
María Elena Velasco – Played La India María
Tom Walker – Plays Jonathan Pie
Bobcat Goldthwait –Played a crazed comic with a loud and wild bobcat-like voice. He played up that character as Officer Zed in Police Academy.

References 

Comedy genres
Acting techniques
Stand-up comedy